The Jenisch park is the oldest landscaped park in Hamburg, Germany, located in the Othmarschen quarter at the Geest shore of River Elbe. Of the area of 43 ha (110 acres), 8 are a protected. Two museums, Jenisch House and Ernst Barlach House, are located within the park. The river Flottbek flows through the park and into the Elbe at Teufelsbrück.

History

Caspar Voght acquired the area along with further nearby fields near Flottbek village from 1785 to 1805. There were four parts: Süderpark (Southern park, today's Jenisch park), Norderpark, (Northern park, today Loki-Schmidt-Garten, Hamburg's botanical garden), Osterpark (Eastern park, today partly a golf course), and Westerpark (Western park, tree nursery intermittently, today Westerpark again). Voght had been inspired by the Leasowes estate of English poet William Shenstone. He designed it along with landscape gardener .

References

External links

 Jenisch park at the Hamburg Environment Authority, in German
 Jenisch park at hamburg.de, in German
 Description of the Association of the Friends of the Jenisch park, in German

Heritage sites in Hamburg
Buildings and structures in Altona, Hamburg
Parks in Hamburg
Tourist attractions in Hamburg
1790s establishments in the Holy Roman Empire